Ernest Günther I of Schleswig-Holstein-Sonderburg-Augustenburg (14 October 1609 – 18 January 1689) was a Duke of Schleswig-Holstein of its Sonderborg line. He was the first to have his ducal seat in Augustenborg Palace, which he built and named in honor of his wife. He ruled from 1647 until his death in 1689.

He was third son of Alexander, Duke of Schleswig-Holstein-Sonderburg and his wife Countess Dorothea of Schwarzburg-Sondershausen.

Family and children
On 15 June 1651 he married Auguste of Schleswig-Holstein-Sonderburg-Glücksburg (27 June 1633 – 26 May 1701), daughter of Duke Philipp of Schleswig-Holstein-Sonderburg-Glücksburg and Princess Sophie Hedwig of Saxe-Lauenburg. They had ten children:
 Frederick (10 December 1652 – 3 August 1692)
 Sophie Amalie (25 August 1654 – 7 December 1655)
 Philip Ernest (24 October 1655 – 8 September 1677)
 Sophie Auguste (2 February 1657 – 20 July 1657)
 Louise Charlotte (13 April 1658 – 2 May 1740), married on 1 January 1685 to Duke Frederick Louis of Holstein-Sonderburg-Beck
 Ernestine Justine (30 July 1659 – 18 October 1662)
 Ernest August (3 October 1660 – 11 May 1731)
 Dorothea Louise (11 October 1663 – 21 April 1721), Abbess of Itzehoe in 1686-1721
 a child, born and died 18 December 1665
 Frederick William (18 November 1668 – 3 June 1714)

References

Citations

Bibliography
 

1609 births
1689 deaths
People from Augustenborg, Denmark
Dukes of Schleswig-Holstein-Sonderburg-Augustenburg
House of Augustenburg